The 2018 Big South Conference baseball tournament was held from May 22 through 26.  The top eight regular season finishers of the conference's ten teams met in the double-elimination tournament, which was held at Liberty Baseball Stadium in Lynchburg, Virginia.  The tournament champion, Campbell, earned the conference's automatic bid to the 2018 NCAA Division I baseball tournament.

Seeding and format
The top eight finishers of the league's ten teams qualified for the double-elimination tournament. Teams were seeded based on conference winning percentage, with the first tiebreaker being head-to-head record.

Results

References

Tournament
Big South Conference Baseball Tournament
Big South Conference baseball tournament
Big South Conference baseball tournament